= A Little Bit of My Love =

Single by Scott Wozniak featuring Althea McQueen
- Released: March 30, 1998
- Label: Velocity Recordings
- Songwriter(s): Scott Wozniak; Althea McQueen
- Producer(s): Scott Wozniak

"A Little Bit of My Love" is an electronic song produced by Scott Wozniak and featuring vocals from Althea McQueen. The song was released as a double 12" vinyl record in 1998 on Velocity Recordings, with a total of eight different mixes of the song.

== Track listing ==
All tracks are written by Scott Wozniak and Althea McQueen.

Disc one – side one
No.	Title	Length
1.	"A Little Bit of My Love" (Original)
2.	"A Little Bit of My Love" (Runnin Drums)

Disc one – side two
No.	Title	Length
1.	"A Little Bit of My Love" (Deep Swing Vox)
2.	"A Little Bit of My Love" (Brothers' Vibe Acapella)

Disc two – side one
No.	Title	Length
1.	"A Little Bit of My Love" (Runnin Dub)
2.	"A Little Bit of My Love" (Deep Swing Dub)

Disc two – side two
No.	Title	Length
1.	"A Little Bit of My Love" (Brothers' Vibe Mix)
2.	"A Little Bit of My Love" (Deep Swing Instrumental)

== Charts ==
Chart (1998)	Peak position
US Dance Club Songs (Billboard)	26
